XHPBCQ-FM is a radio station on 94.9 FM in Cancún, Quintana Roo, Mexico. The station is owned by Promo Éxitos and known as La Z with a regional Mexican format.

History
XHPBCQ was awarded in the IFT-4 radio auction of 2017 for 86.5 million pesos and was the most expensive single station in the entire auction. It came on air by 2019 and simulcast the Alfa pop format from XHFAJ-FM 91.3 in Mexico City.

Grupo Radio Centro initiated a process to sell 10 stations outside Mexico City, including XHPBCQ, in 2020. In October 2021, the Federal Telecommunications Institute approved the transfer of XHPBCQ and Promotora de Éxitos to Rafael Aguirre and his company, La Mera en Playa, S.A. de C.V.

In May 2022, XHCCQ/XECCQ 91.5/630 was relaunched under Audiorama's La Bestia Grupera brand, and La Z moved from XHCCQ to XHPBCQ.

References

External links

2019 establishments in Mexico
Radio stations established in 2019
Radio stations in Quintana Roo
Regional Mexican radio stations
Spanish-language radio stations